Rashtrapati may refer to:

Rashtrapati Award
Rashtrapati Bhavan, the official residence of the President of India
Rashtrapati Nilayam, the official winter retreat of the President of India
Rastrapati Bhawan, the official Residence of the President of Nepal

See also